Betty, Libby, Liz or Elizabeth Davies may refer to:

Political figures
Libby Davies (born 1953), Canadian MP from Vancouver
Liz Davies (born 1963), English barrister and political activist

Others
Elizabeth Valerie Davies (1912–2001), Welsh swimmer at 1932 Summer Olympics; a/k/a Valerie Davies and Valerie Latham
Betty Ann Davies (1910–1955), English stage, film and TV actress
Elizabeth Davies (nurse)
Elizabeth Davies (criminal), associate of Jenny Diver

See also
Elizabeth Davies-Colley
Elizabeth Davis (disambiguation)
Lisa Davies (disambiguation)